Vandalur is a census town and residential locality in southern part of the metropolitan city of Chennai, India. It is a neighbourhood in the southwestern part of Chennai. Vandalur serves as the southern gateway to Chennai city. It has the Arignar Anna Zoological Park, which contain some rare species of wild flora and fauna. The neighbourhood is served by Vandalur railway station of the Chennai Suburban Railway network.

Demographics
As per 2011 census, Vandalur had total population of 16,852. Males constitute 49.9% of the population and females 50%. Vandalur has an average literacy rate of 79%, higher than the national average of 59.5%: male literacy is 85%, and female literacy is 72%. In Vandalur, 11% of the population is under 6 years of age.

Connectivity
Vandalur is a residential area in Chennai City region approximately 6 km to the south of Tambaram. It is adjacent to the neighbourhoods of Peerkankaranai, Perungalathur, Mudichur, Guduvancheri and Mannivakkam.

Road
Vandalur forms the junction of the Vandalur-Kelambakkam Road, Connecting the Grand Southern Trunk Road (GST) with Old Mamallapuram Road (OMR). The Outer Ring Road (Vandalur - Minjur) is a major transport corridor being developed along the periphery of Chennai Metropolitan Area by the CMDA. The Vandalur Flyover to be inaugurated in January 2012 will connect the east and west side of the Vandalur railway station. It will have a bowstring design similar to that of Rangarajapuram flyover.
A satellite commercial corridor is likely to be developed along the Outer Ring Road (ORR)

65-acre terminus for south-bound buses at Vandalur:
The Chennai Mofussil Bus Terminus in Koyambedu, when opened in 2002, was touted as the largest in Asia. Now, the Chennai Metropolitan Development Authority has identified land for a new terminus in Vandalur, that will be more than twice the size of the CMBT, to handle south-bound long-distance buses and ease the pressure on the Koyambedu facility.

Distance Chart

Rail
The nearest train station is Vandalur Railway Station on the Chennai Suburban Railway line. The proposed Chennai monorail project envisages two lines from Vandalur - Vandalur to Puzhal and Vandalur to Velachery.

Arignar Anna Zoological Park
Arignar Anna Zoological Park located here also known as Vandalur Zoo. The Park was the first public zoo in India. Vandalur Zoo is originally created in 1855 near Park Town, Chennai City. Later in 1875, this zoo had expanded and moved out of the city. In 1979, the Tamil Nadu Forest department moved this zoo to Vandalur reserve forest covering an area of 1300 acres. This zoo was inaugurated in year 1985 and it's one of the largest in South Asia. There are totally 81 enclosures. More than 170 species of mammals, aviaries and reptiles are exhibited in the zoo.

Vandalur Hill
Vandalur hill is part of Arignar Anna Zoological Park and public entry to the hill is restricted. The hilltop provides a good view of the OMR and Mannivakam. The Tamil Nadu Forest department has a sapling center under the foothill of Vandalur hill. The run has a total ascent of 274.99 ft and has a maximum elevation of 484.97 ft.

Amenities

Educational Institutions in Vandalur
Crescent School
TS Baliah Matriculation School
Shri Natesan Vidyasala Matriculation Hr Sec School near Mudichur
Sri Viswa Vidyalaya Matriculation Hr Sec School
Annai Velankanni Matriculation School
St. John's Nursery and Primary School
Shalom Matriculation Higher Secondary School
Government High School
SSM Montessori School
B. S. Abdur Rahman University (formerly Crescent Engineering College)
Sri Ramanujar Engineering College
Tagore Engineering College
Sri Krishna Engineering College
Tamil Nadu Physical Education and Sports University
VIT Chennai Campus
Sri Balaji Polytechnic College
GKM College of Engineering and Technology
Indian Institute of Information Technology, Design and Manufacturing (IIITDM)
Chennai School of Ship Management
Delhi Public School
Little Kids PreSchool
 PERI Institute Of Technology

Vandalur-Walajabad flyover
This flyover will replace the level crossing near Vandalur railway station. The Rs. 46.78 crore flyover on the Vandalur-Walajabad Road was inaugurated January 27, 2012. The 1.48-km-long flyover will replace a level crossing near the Vandalur railway station.

Location in Context

Gallery

See also

Arignar Anna Zoological Park Chennai
B. S. Abdur Rahman University Chennai
Kalyan Kometel - Sarovar Hotel, Vandalur
Gold Souk Grande Mall Chennai
Mudichur Chennai
Perungalathur Chennai
Urapakkam, Chengalpattu district

References

External links

 GST Road Traffic Issues The Hindu
 Indian Gaur safari at Vandalur zoo The Hindu
 Roads to the future - 3 key stretches on the city's outskirts Hindu Property Plus
 The orbital beltway - Vandalur to Minjur Outer Ring Road The Hindu
 Monorail Phase I - Vandalur to Velachery/Puzhal The Hindu
 News about Gold Souk Grande Mall, Vandalur India Retailing
 Vandalur Flyover Work Is Nearing Completion
 TN clears second phase of Outer Ring Road project

Cities and towns in Chennai district
Neighbourhoods in Chennai